The 1924 Clemson Tigers football team represented Clemson College—now known as Clemson University—as a member of the Southern Conference (SoCon) during the 1924 college football season. Led by second-year head coach Bud Saunders, the Tigers compiled an overall record of 2–6 with a mark of 0–3 in conference play, tying for 19th place in the SoCon.

Schedule

References

Clemson
Clemson Tigers football seasons
Clemson Tigers football